Tamal Krishna Goswami (1946–2002), born Thomas G. Herzig in New York City, New York, United States, served on the International Society for Krishna Consciousness's Governing Body Commission since its inception in 1970. He completed a bachelor's degree in religious studies at Southern Methodist University.

Honorifics
 His Holiness
 Srila Gurudeva
 Maharaja

Biography

Born in Harlem, New York, he began associating with the Hare Krishna movement in 1968, and was accepted as a disciple by A.C. Bhaktivedanta Swami Prabhupāda soon thereafter. From 1975 until 1979, Tamal Krishna Goswami headed the "Radha-Damodara Party". The party consisted of hundreds of Bhaktivedanta Swami's disciples, who traveled around the USA on buses, distributing Bhaktivedanta Swami's books.

The Governing Body Commission (GBC) is the managerial authority of the International Society for Krishna Consciousness. ISKCON's founder, Bhaktivedanta Swami, created the GBC in 1972 and since that time it has met on an annual basis. Tamal Krishna Goswami was a member of this body since its beginning.

Tamal Krishna Goswami died in a vehicular accident on 15 March 2002 at Phuliya in West Bengal, India. His samadhi (tomb) is placed beside Bhaktivedanta Swami's samadhi in ISKCON Sri Mayapur Dhama, West Bengal, India.

Literary contributions

The Mysterious Pastimes of Mohini-murti
The Mysterious Pastimes of Mohini-murti is a 20th-century Hindu commentary by Tamal Krishna Goswami on the Goddess Mohini.

This commentary on the Hindu Goddess Mohini was produced by Tamal Krishna Goswami in the Fall of 1993. Mohini-lila plays an important role on the periphery of Vaishnavism. There are two popular lilas of Mohini which can be found in Canto Eight (chapters 9 and 12) of the Bhagavata Purana. Mohini also plays a prominent role in the popular Hindu story known as "the churning of the ocean of milk," and her role in this story is mentioned in numerous Hindu texts, such as the two Epics, most of the Puranas, and numerous vernacular literature. The Mysterious Pastimes of Mohini-murti is covered in two chapters of Bhaktivedanta Swami's translation and commentary on the Eight Canto of the Bhagavata Purana, Chapter 9, The Lord Incarnates as Mohini-murti and Chapter 12, The Mohini-murti Incarnation Bewilders Lord Shiva.

In this commentary, Bhaktivedanta Swami's discussions of Mohini-lila especially as they relate to gender roles in verse 8.9.9 are analyzed and considered. This includes the notable passage from Bhaktivedanta Swami's commentary.

This commentary was released as a vinyl album in 1993. On the cover of the vinyl album, there is an artistic rendering of an episode of Mohini-lila from the Bhagavata Purana. This depiction on the album cover, is used to illustrate the puranic mythology under discussion.  The audio files are available online.

Happiness is a Science
Happiness is a Science - Aditi's Vow is a 20th-century Hindu theological commentary made in 1993 by Tamal Krishna Goswami in regards to the Goddess Aditi as detailed in the eighth canto of the Bhagavata Purana. This commentary discusses Aditi's vow, Payovrata, which she undertakes for the benefit of her children the Adityas.

In the narrative, Mahabali Maharaja, king of the demons, had conquered the heavenly planets and driven out their rulers, the Adityas - Aditi's children. The commentary by Tamal Krishna Goswami centers on Aditi's sacrifice in which she undertook a vow of importance (the vow which is referenced is Payovrata) and discusses why Aditi undertook this vow or vrata in order to bring her children back to the heavenly planets.

This commentary was released as a vinyl album in 1993. The audio files are available online.

Books
 
 
 Audiocassettes plus book.
 
 
 Published as Yoga for the 21st Century in 1994 and Yoga for the New Millennium in 2000.

See also

Vishnujana Swami
List of ISKCON members and patrons

Footnotes

External links
Official Srila Tamal Krishna Goswami Website
Tamal Krishna Goswami Tape Ministry
ISKCON Website
"Obituary: Tamal Krishna Goswami" by Dr. Julius J. Lipner
Krishna.com

Papers and books by Tamal Krishna Goswami
Dr. Julius J. Lipner's Comments
Perils of Succession, Part 1
Perils of Succession, Part 2
Books by Tamal Krishna Gosvami

Tamal Krishna Goswami
Tamal Krishna Goswami
Converts to Hinduism from Judaism
1946 births
2002 deaths
Tamal Krishna Goswami
20th-century American Jews
Southern Methodist University alumni
Alumni of Clare Hall, Cambridge